USS Breaker is a name used more than once by the U.S. Navy:

 , a small schooner captured by the Union Navy during the American Civil War.
 , wooden-hulled launch used as a ferry by the Navy.
 , a steam trawler constructed in 1912 at Quincy, Massachusetts.

References 
 

United States Navy ship names